Chinese traditional  music includes various music genres which have been inherited for generations in China. Specifically, this term refers to the music genres originated in or before Qing dynasty. According to the appearance, the genres can be classified into instrumental ensemble, instrumental solo, theatre, shuochang, dance music and song. It is now the primary classification in both research and education, although some genres contain different forms of performance and thus do not belong to a single category. The genres could also be classified into literati music, folk music, religious music and palace music, according to their cultural connotations or purpose.

Instrumental ensemble

 Nanguan music
 Zhihua Temple Music
 Teochew string music
 Jiangnan sizhu

Instrumental solo

 Guqin
 Pipa

Theatre

 Kunqu
 Peking opera

Dance music
 Muqam

References